Keith Lewis can refer to:

 Keith Lewis (Australian cricketer) (1923-2012), Australian cricketer
 Keith Lewis (English cricketer) (1929-2015), English cricketer
 Keith Lewis (safety) (born 1981), American football player
 Keith Lewis (cornerback) (born 1989), American football player